Sirindhornia is a genus of flowering plants in the family Orchidaceae native to China and Indochina. It contains three known species.

Sirindhornia mirabilis H.A.Pedersen & Suksathan - Thailand
Sirindhornia monophylla (Collett & Hemsl.) H.A.Pedersen & Suksathan - Yunnan, Thailand, Myanmar
Sirindhornia pulchella H.A.Pedersen & Indham. - Thailand

See also 
 List of Orchidaceae genera

References

External links 

Orchideae genera
Orchids of Asia
Orchideae